Pulraut (Yaghnobi: Пулла Роԝут Pulla Rowut or Пулла Роԝт) is a village in Sughd Region, northwestern Tajikistan. It is part of the jamoat Anzob in the Ayni District. Its population was 11 in 2007.

Notes

References

Populated places in Sughd Region
Yaghnob